The Howe School is a historic school building at 390 Boston Road in Billerica, Massachusetts.  This three story brick building was built in 1852 with funding from a bequest by Zadok Howe, and served the town as a secondary educational institution for 100 years.  Designed by Daniel G. Bean of Lowell, the building including an innovative ventilation system for bringing warm and fresh air into the classrooms.  At first a private academy, it was designated the town's high school in 1896, and later served as a grade school and as school administration offices.  The building is now operated by the local historical society as a museum.

The building was listed on the National Register of Historic Places in 2002.

See also
National Register of Historic Places listings in Middlesex County, Massachusetts

References

External links
Howe School Museum - Billerica Historical Society

School buildings on the National Register of Historic Places in Massachusetts
Buildings and structures in Billerica, Massachusetts
National Register of Historic Places in Middlesex County, Massachusetts
Museums in Middlesex County, Massachusetts
School buildings completed in 1852
1852 establishments in Massachusetts